The Austrian Centre of Industrial Biotechnology (ACIB) is an international research institution for industrial biotechnology. Research facilities are located in Graz, Linz, Innsbruck, Tulln and Vienna, with additional research sites in Heidelberg, Bielefeld, Pavia, Rzeszów, Barcelona, Canterbury and Taiwan. The administrative headquarters are located in Graz.

History 
ACIB was founded in 2010 and is a COMET Centre (K2) in the funding program COMET – Competence Centers for Excellent Technologies. It was preceded by the Research Centre Applied Biocatalysis in Graz and the Austrian Center of Biopharmaceutical Technology in Vienna. Owners of acib are the University of Innsbruck and the University of Graz, the Graz University of Technology, the University of Natural Resources and Applied Life Sciences, Vienna and Joanneum Research. The K2 center is funded within the COMET program by the BMVIT, BMDW as well as the federal states of Styria, Vienna, Lower Austria and Tyrol. The COMET program is managed by the FFG.

Research
acib is developing more environmentally friendly and economic processes for the biotechnological, pharmaceutical and chemical industries. All these processes are modelled on methods and tools from nature.

Research areas include biocatalysis and chemical analytics, enzyme technologies and protein engineering, microbial biotechnology, cell line development and epigenetic, bioinformatic and simulations, bioprocess technologies as well as bioeconomy and environmental biotechnology.

Notes

External links
 

 Research institutes in Austria
 Research institutes established in 2010
 Biotechnology organizations
 Biochemistry research institutes
 Biotechnology companies established in 2010
 Biotechnology companies of Austria
 Graz University of Technology
 University of Natural Resources and Life Sciences, Vienna
 University of Graz
2010 establishments in Austria